Union Center or Union Centre can refer to:

Places
Canada
 Union Centre, Nova Scotia

United States
 Union Center, Illinois
 Union Center, Indiana
 Union Center, South Dakota
 Union Center, Wisconsin
 Union Center Township, Elk County, Kansas